The Baik–Deift–Johansson theorem is a result from combinatorics. It deals with the subsequences of a randomly uniformly drawn permutation from the set . The theorem makes a statement about the distribution of the length of the longest increasing subsequence in the limit. The theorem was influential in probability theory since it connected the KPZ-universality with the theory of random matrices.

The theorem was proven in 1999 by Jinho Baik, Percy Deift and Kurt Johansson.

Statement 
For each  let  be a uniformly chosen permutation with length .

Then we have for every  that

where  is the Tracy-Widom distribution of the Gaussian unitary ensemble.

Literature

References 

Combinatorics
Probability